This article is a list of public sculptures designed by Maxime Real del Sarte.

War Memorials using the composition entitled "Je t'ai cherché"

The plaster model entitled "Je t'ai cherché" was first exhibited in 1920 at the Salon des Artistes Français under reference number 3396, and the composition was used by Real del Sarte for five war memorials.  These are listed below.

"Je t'ai cherché" translates as "I looked/searched for you".  Sarte works the compositions beautifully and there are connotations of Mary covering Jesus' body with a shroud or winding sheet

War memorials using the composition "Terre de France"

Other war memorials

Works featuring Joan of Arc

Bust of Joan of Arc in the Basilique-Jeanne-d'Arc in Paris

Construction of this Basilique in honour of Joan of Arc was finished in 1964.  Apart from a bust of Joan of Arc by Real del Sarte inside the church, there is a statue of Joan of Arc outside the church by Félix Charpentier  The site of the church was chosen specifically as it is next to the church of Saint-Denys de la Chapelle where Joan of Arc was greeted in 1429.

Statue of Joan of Arc in Rouen

Perhaps the best known of Real del Sarte's sculptures of Joan of Arc, this stands in the place du Vieux-Marché by the Église Sainte-Jeanne-d'Arc in Rouen. The work was completed in 1929.  The church is relatively new having been constructed as part of the re-development of the area. The church was designed by Louis Arretche, and was finally consecrated on 29 April 1975. Real del Satre's work shows Joan at the stake with the flames starting to catch the bottom of her robe. The work is known as "Jeanne au bûcher" and there are copies of it in other locations in France and in Montréal and Buenos Aires.  See later entries.

Statue of Joan of Arc or The Angel of Peace in Poitiers 

A statue by Real del Sarte stands in the square des Cordeliers in Poitiers.  The statue is known as "The Angel of Peace".

Statue of Joan of Arc in the church Saint-Philippe-du-Roule in Paris

The marble statue, installed in 1920, stands in the choir area of the church. Joan wears a suit of armour with "Gallia" inscribed on her shield.

Bust of Joan of Arc

This work is located in the Église Saint-Rémy in Domrémy-la-Pucelle in the Vosges district of Lorraine.  Real del Sarte carves the head of Joan in white marble. Her eyes are closed and she wears a bronze crown of thorns. The pedestal is of onyx and on the front Real del Sarte has carved a dove with open wings. The work was completed in 1929.

Statue of Joan of Arc in Marseilles

Another copy of the Rouen "Jeanne au bûcher"  stands in the Église Saint-Philippe, 121 rue Sylvabelle – 6e arrondissement of Marseilles. A work in stone, completed in 1937.

Statue of Joan of Arc in Nimes

The stone statue of Joan of Arc stands in the Place des Carmes in Nîmes in Gard. A committee to organize the erection of the statue was formed in 1942 and after a public subscription organised in 1943, the pedestal for the statue was erected in front of the church of Saint-Paul in May 1943.  The statue itself was delivered in April, 1944 and stored in a hangar near Beauclaire.  It was officially delivered to the town in December 1956 but the decision to erect it was delayed until 1964.  This work was also supplied to Limoges in 1942 and to Grenoble in 1945.  Experts have expressed the view that Real del Sarte had been inspired by the statue of Joan of Arc sculpted by Paul Dardé  for Montpellier in 1918. At the foot of the statue, and in bronze is a sculpture depicting a heart being consumed by flames.  The text, "Rouen 1431″ records the year and place of Joan's execution and there is also an inscription stating -"Ce coeur contient de la terre prelevee au lieu sacre du bûcher de Jeanne d'Arc".  This tells us that the heart contains soil from the spot where Joan was burnt at the stake".

Statue of Joan of Arc in Montréal

A replica of Real del Sarte's representation of Joan of Arc in Rouen. Her eyes are closed and she is praying, her feet on a stake and flames are beginning to envelop her. The work is carved from the hard stone of Poitou.  The work measures a little over 3 metres and weighs 4 tons. The work was a gift by the sculptor to the University of Montréal.  At the base of the statue Real del Sarte has carved the words This is one of five replicas of Real del Sarte's 1928 composition for Rouen known as "Jeanne au bûcher" and in 1950, Real del Sarte made a gift of the work to the then rector of Montréal University in recognition of Franco-Canadian friendship and the religious nature of the university at that time.

The work "Jeanne au bûcher" in Buenos Aires in Argentina

Another replica of the Rouen work can be seen in Buenos Aires in Argentine.  It is located near the entrance to the Club de los Pescadores facing Jorge Newberry airport by the Rio de la Plata. It carries the inscription It is recorded that this was a gift made in 1948 by Alberto Dodero of Compañía Argentina de Navegación Dodero S.A.

Statue of Joan of Arc in Vaucouleurs Castle

At the end of the Second World War, the US Congress commissioned a statue of Joan of Arc intended for the "Congressional Hall of Heroes".  Real del Sarte was the sculptor but when it was time to pay for the work, Congress refused to pay. It was purchased instead by the Department of the Meuse and was placed in the upper church of the Vaucouleurs castle, where it remains to this day. The upper church is closed to the general public but with special permission from the city it may be viewed.

Statue of Joan of Arc in Wissous in Essonne

Another copy of the Rouen  "Jeanne d'Arc au bûcher" composition, this time in plaster.

Other works- Those with a military theme

Monument to the Polish volunteers of the 1914-1918 war

This monument is dedicated to all the Polish volunteers who fought alongside the French army in the 1914-1918 war especially in May 1915 and the fighting at Souchez, Carency, and Neuville-Saint-Vaast. The erection of the monument was organised by members of the Polish community in France. It was inaugurated on 21 May 1933 by the Polish ambassador. The inscriptions read  which translates as "our liberty and yours" and

Tank Memorial at Berry-Au-Bac

The Tank Memorial (Mémorial des Chars d'Assaut) pays tribute to all those tank drivers who fell in the course of 1917–1918. It was erected following the efforts of a group of ex-infantrymen, and inaugurated on 2 July 1922 in the presence of both Marshals Foch and Pétain and Generals Mangin and Weygand, as well as General Estienne, the so-called "father of the tank".  The monument is situated at Choléra Farm from where a mass attack of French tanks was thrown in the direction of Juvincourt on 16 April 1917. A plaque to the rear of the memorial recalls that on 16 April 1917, the 151st Infantry Regiment continued to advance with the assistance of Bossut's tanks right up to Béliers Wood.  There are some tanks dating back to the 1950s on display near the memorial.

Monument to General Mangin in Paris

A monument to General Mangin was erected in the place Denys-Cochin in Paris, with sculptural work by Real del Sarte.  It was destroyed in October 1940 by the occupying Germans, one of the few memorials linked to the 1914-1918 war that was touched by them.  It is recorded that the instruction to destroy the monument came from Adolf Hitler himself.  The work was reconstructed after the war and re-erected by the church of Saint-François-Xavier in Paris' 7th arrondissement. There was another statue of Mangin in the "clairière de Rethondes" but this was also pulled down by the Germans. The Germans had not forgotten Mangin's record when he was the Governor of the occupied Rhineland in the 1920s.

Monument dedicated to the 106th French Infantry Regiment

It was by their efforts in the Battle of the Marne from 6 to 12 September 1914 that the Franco-British forces halted the German advance and by mid-September the front started to form.  The German Army took up position on the "Crête des Éparges" (Éparges ridge) about 20 kilometres east of Verdun. This ridge provided an excellent observation point to whoever held it and from February to April 1915,  the French attempted to dislodge the Germans from it. It was the 106th French Infantry that led the fighting under the command of sub-lieutenant Maurice Genevoix. The fighting was brutal with the area under constant artillery fire and conditions were amongst the hardest endured along the front-line.  Finally on 11 April 1915, whilst both sides were claiming victory,  the French had taken 80% of the ridge by not "Point X" which had been their objective. The fighting for the Éparges ridge was the precursor for the commencement of the fighting at Verdun in 1916.  Losses were substantial.  The style of fighting changed as the war progressed and in this and other areas much of it was now to take place underground. The war became a war of mines and it was not until 1918 that the ridge was finally taken, this with much assistance from colonial and American troops. It was at  Éparges that Real del Sarte fought and lost part of one arm, so it was fitting that he should carry out the sculpture for the regimental memorial erected in 1935. The work was supervised by Georges Ricome who had been an officer with the regiment. The words "Je crois" are inscribed on the front of the memorial and on one side there is a quotation from Maurice Genevoix- The bas-relief is said to be a metaphor portraying the descent from the Cross, with Mary being France itself and Christ a soldier who has sacrificed his life for the Motherland.

Statue of Maréchal Joffre

Real del Sarte's bronze statue shows Joffre on a horse and he appears to be pointing to the nearby Eiffel tower.  It is located on the Champ de Mars in Paris, just by the École Militaire. It was sculpted in 1939 by Real del Sarte.

The Ferme de Navarin Monument. Souhain in Oise

Maxime Real del Sarte's composition on the top of this monument's pyramid shape structure features a group of three soldiers in "attack" mode. Reportedly the soldier in the centre was meant to represent a likeness of General Gouraud. The soldier on the right was supposedly based on Quentin Roosevelt, the nephew of  Theodore Roosevelt who was killed near Cambrai on 14 July 1918, and the soldier on the left was said to be based on Maxime Real del Sarte's brother, killed in the Champagne during the war.  Del Sarte himself was injured fighting in the Éparges section of the Verdun front on 29 January 1916 and part of his left arm had to be amputated.  The monument remembers the efforts of the French army units who fought in the area.

Other works

Work entitled "Vendéen fidèle"

In this 1935 work hommage is paid to the population of the Vendée.  The work is 2.50 metres high.

Statue in the Église St Vaast in Béthune

A statue of St Michael slaying a dragon can be seen in the Église St Vaast in Béthune.

Monument aux Infirmières in Pierrefonds

This monument honours those nurses who lost their lives on the battlefields in the 1914–1918 war. It is located in the chaussée Defublé. Elisabeth Jalaguier, born in 1890, was active as a nurse in the 1914–1918 war and served at the Hôtel des Bains in Pierrefonds which was being used as a military hospital.  In 1918 she was struck during an aerial bombardment and died three months after the war ended.  In May 1919 she was awarded the Légion d'Honneur. A white stone was placed on the spot where Jalaguier was struck and in 1933 a public subscription was organised by another nurse called "Maman Perdon" and a Doctor Ferrand and in June 1955 the monument was erected in place of the white stone. The "Union Nationale des Combattants" had sold the monument to Pierrefonds and it was restored and erected in the town in 1996. The statue was cast in bronze based on a plaster model by Real del Sarte.

Sculptures on the tombs of Philippe d'Orléans (1869–1926) and Ferdinand d'Orléans (1884–1924)

These works by Real del Sarte are in the Chapelle royale Saint-Louis at Dreux in Eure-et-Loir

Sculpture of Mary and Child in Lausanne

This work is located in one of the two chapels of reconciliation in the parish church of St Joseph in Lausanne.

Monument dedicated to Edward VII

Real del Sarte was the sculptor of this monument in Biarritz. It was inaugurated in 1922.

Church of Saint-Louis in Port-Gentil

This church in Gabon was built between 1928 and 1936 and was given the name of Louis in honour of Monseigneur Louis Matron whose idea it was to build the church.  The church contains a statue of Saint Louis by Real Del Sarte (1888-1954).

The work "Le premier toit" 

This Real del Sarte work is located in Le Parc Pasteur in  Orléans in Loiret.  It is on loan from the Louvre in Paris. It is recorded that Real del Sarte had started this piece in 1914 and before enlisting in the army and when he returned from fighting and recovered from his wound, he returned to it. It is a stark composition featuring a naked man and woman who face each other on their knees, each putting their arms on the other's shoulders.  The sculpture was awarded the Grand Prix National des Beaux-Arts in 1921.  
 The description "Le premier toit" translates as "The first roof".

The sculpture entitled "Résistance" in Misérieux in Ain,  Rhône-Alpes

Sculpted in Sicilian stone in 1920.  Portrays a naked couple in combat.

The work La Femme au chat

Also in Buenos Aires, and another gift to the city by Alberto Dodero, is a marble work entitled "La Femme au chat". It measures 1.60 metres in height. It is located in the Palermo quarter of the city at "Las Canitas" on the avenue Chenaut et Arce.

Statue of Saint Maxime

This work in white painted stone is located in the Église paroissiale Saint-Maxime in Antony in Hauts-de-Seine in the Ile-de-France.  It is dated 1946. Del Sarte portrays Saint Maxime in the attire of a bishop. He stands over a dragon which he has just slain.  Originally the statue was placed inside the church but is now located outside.

Statue of Saint Sébastien

This small statue is located in the Saint-Nicolas parish church in the rue de l'Eglise, Baboeuf in the Oise region of Picardy. It is carved from a combination of wood and stone, the arrows piercing St Sébastien being in wood.

Various furnishings for the parish church of Saint-Jacques-le-Majeur in Courtavon in Haut-Rhin Alsace

For this church in the rue de la Chapelle, Sarte worked on an altar table, a cross, a war memorial and various statues and tombstones.

Two Inscribed tablets in remembrance of the dead of the 1914-1918 war

This Sarte work is located in the parish church of Saint-Melaine in La Chapelle-de-Brain in Ille-et-Vilaine in Brittany. It comprises two tablets with both being inscribed " AUX ENFANTS DE LA PAROISSE / MORTS POUR LA FRANCE / 1914 1918 / LA CHAPELLE SAINT MELAINE".  The tablet on the left hand side reads " MISERICORDIEUX JESUS / DONNEZ LEUR LE REPOS ETERNEL / CEUX QUI PIEUSEMENT SONT MORTS POUR LA PATRIE / ONT DROIT QU'A LEUR CERCUEIL LA FOULE VIENNE ET PRIE" whilst that on the right reads "VIERGE COMPATISSANTE / CONSOLEZ LES AFFLIGES / HEUREUX CEUX QUI SONT MORTS DANS LES GRANDES BATAILLES / COUCHES DESSUS LE SOL A LA FACE DE DIEU". The names of those honoured are listed in the order they died.

Monument to Alexander of Yugoslavia

This monument stands in the Place de Colombie in the 16e arrondissement of Paris.  It was completed in 1936. Cast in bronze by the foundry Durenne the inscriptions read  and in a bronze plaque at the rear another inscriptions read  and

Bust on the grave of Ernest Berger in the Cimetière de Vaugirard

The cemetery contains the graves of many members of the extreme right factions supporting the royalist cause in France. There are members of the "Camelots du roi" and of  "Action Française" buried here, many of whom were to suffer violent deaths.  Marius André, Pierre Juhel, Georges Calzant and Eugène Marsan are all buried here as well as Marius Plateau killed in 1923 and Marcel Langois killed in fights with communist agitators.  The grave of Ernest Berger, assassinated in 1925, is adorned by a bust by Real del Sarte.

Statue of Louise Bettignies in Lille

Real del Sarte was the sculptor of this statue in Lille. Bettignies had worked as a spy for the British in the 1914-1918 war, using the name Alice Dubois.

Statue of the Duke of Sicily

Real del Sarte was the sculptor of this statue in Hautville la Guichard. It was completed in 1934.

Stations of the Cross/Chemin des Croix in Saint Jean de Luz

Real del Sarte completed the Stations of the Cross for the church of Saint Jean de Luz in 1950.

References

Sculptures by artist